Sound Transit (ST), officially the Central Puget Sound Regional Transit Authority, is a public transit agency serving the Seattle metropolitan area in the U.S. state of Washington. It operates the Link light rail system in Seattle and Tacoma, regional Sounder commuter rail, and Sound Transit Express bus service. The agency also coordinates the regional ORCA fare card system, which is also used by local transit operators. In 2017, Sound Transit services carried a total of 47 million passengers and averaged 157,000 riders on weekdays.

Sound Transit was created in 1993 by King, Pierce and Snohomish counties to build a regional rapid transit system. After an unsuccessful proposal in 1995, the agency's plan for regional light rail, commuter rail, and express bus service, named "Sound Move", was approved in November 1996. ST began operating its express bus service in September 1999, taking over existing routes from local transit agencies. The region's first commuter rail line, between Tacoma and Seattle, started in December 2000; the agency's first light rail line, Tacoma Link (now the T Line), began service in August 2003. Light rail service in Seattle on Central Link (now the 1 Line) began in 2009, and is the largest part of the Sound Transit system in terms of ridership. Union Station in Seattle has served as the agency's headquarters since its renovation in 1999.

Sound Transit is independent of local transit agencies and is governed by an eighteen-member Board of Directors made up of elected officials from member jurisdictions and the Secretary of Transportation. It is funded by local sales taxes, property taxes, and motor vehicle excise taxes, levied within its taxing district in portions of King, Pierce and Snohomish counties. The agency has passed three major ballot measures to fund system expansion: Sound Move (1996), Sound Transit 2 (2008) and Sound Transit 3 (2016).

Services

Sound Transit operates three transit services across the Seattle metropolitan area: the Link light rail system in Seattle and Tacoma; the Sounder commuter rail system from Everett to Lakewood, via Seattle; and the Sound Transit Express bus system across the three counties. In 2017, these systems carried more than 47 million passengers, averaging 156,000 riders on weekdays. All three modes accept cash payment and mobile tickets as well as the regional ORCA card, a contactless proximity card with stored fares and passes.

Link light rail

The two lines, which have no direct connection, are the 1 Line between Seattle, Tukwila, and SeaTac; and the T Line in central Tacoma. Link light rail trains carried 23 million passengers in 2017, averaging 71,058 on weekdays, making it the 10th-busiest light rail system in the United States.

Link trains generally run seven days a week at frequencies of 6 to 24 minutes, with stops spaced closely together. Most stations offer connections to nearby buses or a park and ride facility. T Line trains are akin to streetcars, unable to be coupled into pairs, and are operated and maintained by Sound Transit staff (the only service in the system to not have operations and maintenance performed under contract).

Sounder commuter rail

Sounder is the regional commuter rail service managed by Sound Transit and has two lines that intersect at King Street Station in Downtown Seattle. Trains generally run during rush hours with limited service at other times, including weekend trains for sporting events. The N Line connects Seattle to Everett, stopping at two intermediate stations in Snohomish County. The S Line connects Seattle to Tacoma and Lakewood, stopping at six other stations. Trains are operated under contract by BNSF Railway on leased tracks and maintained under contract by Amtrak.

Sound Transit Express

Sound Transit Express is a network of 28 limited-stop express bus routes providing regional service to cities in all three counties, primarily using a network of high-occupancy vehicle lanes (HOV lanes) on state-maintained freeways. Some routes operate seven days a week, while others are limited to rush hours only. The bus fleet is owned by Sound Transit and buses are operated and maintained under contracts with local transit authorities (Community Transit, King County Metro, and Pierce Transit).

Two bus rapid transit lines, on Interstate 405 and State Route 522, are planned to open in 2026–27 and be known as "Stride".

Organization

Management

Sound Transit has 802 full-time employees  and is headquartered at Union Station in Seattle. The chief executive officer (CEO) of Sound Transit is Julie Timm, who was appointed in 2022 and was formerly the head of the Greater Richmond Transit Company in Virginia. Her predecessor was Peter Rogoff, the former Federal Transit Administrator from 2009 to 2014. Rogoff was hired in 2015 and succeeded Joni Earl, a former city administrator who became Sound Transit CEO in 2001.

The agency has three oversight committees that are filled by citizens from the Sound Transit district. The Citizen Oversight Panel oversees compliance to board policies and financial plans, and is composed of 15 members serving four-year terms after their appointment by the board of directors. The Diversity Oversight Committee promotes employment and contracting opportunities for underprivileged groups and includes members representing community organizations and business organizations. The Citizens Accessibility Advisory Committee has 15 members who represent passengers with disabilities, mobility issues, or are senior citizens. The advisory committee monitors the agency's compliance with the Americans with Disabilities Act and other accessibility requirements.

Board of directors

Sound Transit is governed by a board of directors with 18 members who are appointed based on their positions in regional and local governments. One seat is held by the Washington State Secretary of Transportation, while the remaining seventeen are allocated proportional to their population within the Sound Transit district, with each seat representing approximately 145,000 people. The three county executives of King, Pierce, and Snohomish counties are members of the board and also appoint their remaining seats from local elected positions with approval of the county councils.

The agency's policies are set by the board through their decisions, including maintenance of the long-range plan, budget, and project details. The full board meets at Union Station on the fourth Thursday of the month, which are open to the public and streamed online. The board selects a Chair and two Vice Chairs to serve two-year terms and also assign members to four committees: the Executive Committee, Rider Experience and Operations, System Expansion, and Finance and Audit. In the event that the Chair or Vice Chairs leave office or are otherwise unable to serve their full term, the vacancy can be filled by another member for the remainder of the term.

, the board members are:

Funding

For its 2017 budget, Sound Transit expected annual revenue of $1.6 billion.  93% of that revenue to come from taxes, predominately  local sales taxes, property taxes, and motor vehicle excise taxes, levied within its taxing district in portions of King, Pierce, and Snohomish counties. Passenger fares, investments, and advertising income make up the remaining 7% of revenue.

The agency has successfully passed three major ballot measures to fund system expansion, including Sound Move (1996), Sound Transit 2 (2008), and Sound Transit 3 (2016). Planning and construction of new light rail lines is anticipated to continue until 2041 under the Sound Transit 3 plan. Capital improvement projects will cost $1.3 billion in 2017.

Sound Transit's day-to-day operations were expected to lose $190 million in 2017.  Tax revenues exceeded the capital improvement budget for the year, so the net loss should be $131 million.

Police

Sound Transit contracts with the King County Sheriff's Office for police services. Deputies assigned to Sound Transit wear Sound Transit uniforms and drive patrol cars marked with the Sound Transit logo. There is currently one chief, one captain, five sergeants, four detectives, 23 patrol officers, and a crime analyst assigned full-time to Sound Transit.

Sound Transit officers patrol Sound Transit property around Puget Sound including vehicles (trains & buses) and stations.

History

Background

Throughout the 20th century, Seattle planners and voters rejected various proposals for rapid transit systems. The Forward Thrust program of the late 1960s produced two ballot measures for a rapid transit system that were unable to pass with the state-required supermajority for bonds. Federal funding that was allocated to the project was instead sent to Atlanta, Georgia, forming the Metropolitan Atlanta Rapid Transit Authority. The Municipality of Metropolitan Seattle (Metro), the regional water quality agency, took over bus operations in King County and the city of Seattle on January 1, 1973, after approval from voters in response to the failure of Forward Thrust.

The Puget Sound Council of Governments, an inter-county planning agency, partnered with Metro to complete a light rail corridor study in 1986. The regional transportation plan was amended the following year to include rail transit, and the Washington State Legislature formed a State Rail Development Commission to study a regional transit system with light rail, commuter rail and express buses.

Establishment
The predecessor to Sound Transit was a 1995 ballot measure that was rejected by voters because of its $6.7 billion cost. The first Sound Transit ballot measure passed in 1996 as the current mix of buses, commuter rail and light rail, at a cost of $3.9 billion. By proposing a much smaller light rail system, the remaining funds could be used for the two other services, ensuring that the entire Seattle area received services from the measure.

Sound Transit started out in scandal. The agency faced a crisis of financial mismanagement and poor planning, and federal officials ordered an audit in 2000 and pulled promised funding. After a series of executives resigned in 2001, Joni Earl took the helm and is widely credited with saving the agency. Largely, this was by being more realistic and being more honest with the public — reportedly she used the slogan "Optimism is not our friend." Largely due to her efforts, by 2003 Sound Transit received a clean financial audit, and was re-rewarded the funding lost two years earlier. Despite this, the earlier crisis required Earl to drop about one-third of the originally promised light rail line.

Sound Transit 2

2007 vote
Sound Transit 2 (ST2) was part of a joint ballot measure with the Regional Transportation Investment District entitled Roads and Transit, which was presented to Snohomish, King, and Pierce county voters on November 6, 2007. Sound Transit 2 would have made a number of mass transit related improvements, as well as a series of highway improvements.  These changes included almost  in new light rail lines, four new parking garages, two new Sounder stations, a streetcar line connecting First Hill, Capitol Hill, and the International District, a transit center in Bothell, and two expansion studies, one for studying rapid transit across the SR-520 floating bridge and the other studying the use of the Woodinville Subdivision between Renton and Woodinville. The ballot measure was defeated by voters.

2008 vote
The Sound Transit Board on July 24, 2008 voted to put a reduced Sound Transit 2 plan before voters. It passed by large margins (58% to 42%) on November 4, 2008. The financial plan for the measure shows $17.8 billion expenditure over 15 years, funded with a 5-10% rise in the regional general sales tax, which essentially doubles Sound Transit's revenue. Light rail service will be extended from the currently funded northern terminus at Husky Stadium north to Lynnwood. To the south, the tracks will continue from the current southern terminus at Sea-Tac Airport to the northern edge of Federal Way. The proposed East Link Light Rail will depart from Downtown Seattle and end in Overlake via Bellevue. A First Hill Connector (streetcar) was proposed from Capitol Hill station to the Jackson Street terminus of the former Waterfront Streetcar. In total,  of new two-way light rail track were approved by this measure.

Sounder Commuter Rail will receive longer and more frequent trains, for a 30% increase in service. Express Bus service will be immediately boosted (17% increase in service; 25 additional buses) and Washington State Route 520 will receive a bus rapid transit line. A new commuter rail line is proposed to run from North Renton to Snohomish if additional funding beyond the Sound Transit taxes is secured.

Sound Transit 3

Sound Transit 3 was a ballot measure that was approved by voters during the November 2016 elections in King, Pierce, and Snohomish in Washington. The $53.8 billion Sound Transit 3 plan will expand the existing Link light rail system to the suburbs of Tacoma, Federal Way, Everett and Issaquah, as well as the Seattle neighborhoods of Ballard and West Seattle. The local portion of the measure would be partially funded by increases in sales tax, motor vehicle excise tax, and property tax.

The resulting transit network after the completion of Sound Transit 3 will include  of additional light rail serving 37 new stations; the entire,  light rail system would carry an estimated 600,000 daily passengers. A Sounder commuter rail extension to DuPont and bus rapid transit lines on State Route 522 and Interstate 405 are also part of the package. The package's projects would open in stages from 2024 to 2041.

Projects

University Link is a  extension of the Central Link light rail line (now part of the 1 Line) which opened on March 19, 2016. Construction on the line began on March 6, 2009, and completed in early 2016. The line is underground for its entire route and connects downtown Seattle to the University of Washington via Capitol Hill. The cost of the extension was about $1.9 billion with half of the funding coming from a grant from the Federal Transit Administration.

The South 200th Link Extension is a  extension of the Link Light Rail system. Construction on the line began in May 2013 and opened to the public September 24, 2016. The line is elevated for its entire route and connects Seattle–Tacoma International Airport to the new Angle Lake station and park-and-ride garage at South 200th Street in SeaTac.

The Northgate Link Extension was approved in the 2008 ballot measure, began construction in 2012, and was opened on October 2, 2021. It extended light rail service from the University of Washington to Northgate station, with two intermediate stops along a mostly-tunneled route in north Seattle.

Under construction

The Hilltop Expansion Project is under construction to extend the current T Line from the Theater District Station to St. Joseph Hospital, via Wright Park and Tacoma General Hospital along Stadium Way, Division Street, and Martin Luther King Jr Way. It is planned to open in 2022.

The 2 Line, also known as the East Link Extension, will connect Seattle to Bellevue and Redmond using the Interstate 90 floating bridge. It would terminate at the Microsoft Redmond campus in Redmond's Overlake area. Construction began in 2016 and is expected to open in 2024. A further extension of the 2 Line to Downtown Redmond is planned to open in 2024.

The Lynnwood Link Extension will further extend Lines 1 and 2 from Northgate to Lynnwood, via stations at NE 145th Street, NE 185th Street, and Mountlake Terrace.  Despite concerns that President Trump's proposed budget could cut federal funding for the project, in Fiscal Year 2017, Sound Transit received $100 million of the requested $1.2 billion in federal funding. This funding was followed up in Fiscal Year 2018 with another $100 million. At the end of Fiscal Year 2018, the full $1.2 billion grant, as well as $650 million in low-interest loans were approved by Congress, fully securing the requested federal funding.

The Federal Way Link Extension is planned to extend the 1 Line from Angle Lake station to Redondo/Star Lake, in a plan approved by the region's voters in November 2008. Construction on the project began in 2020 and it will add  of track with stations at Highline Community College, the Star Lake Park & Ride, and Federal Way Transit Center, primarily following Interstate 5.

Funded projects

Under Sound Transit 3, which was approved in 2016, Sound Transit services will expand with $54 billion in funding (combining local taxes and federal grants) over a 25-year period generally beginning with the completion of Sound Transit 2. The measure will add  of light rail, with the completed  system carrying an estimated 500,000 riders per day. The plan also funds Sound Transit Express bus routes, adds three bus rapid transit lines and expands Sounder commuter rail with longer trains, potentially better frequency and two additional stations in Tillicum (near Joint Base Lewis–McChord) and DuPont.

See also
List of rapid transit systems
List of rail transit systems in the United States

Notes

External links

 
Government agencies established in 1993
1993 establishments in Washington (state)
Intermodal transportation authorities in Washington (state)
Bus transportation in Washington (state)
Transit authorities with natural gas buses
Transportation in King County, Washington
Transportation in Snohomish County, Washington
Transportation in Pierce County, Washington